The Dennistoun Glacier is a glacier,  long, draining the northern slopes of Mounts Black Prince, Royalist and Adam in the Admiralty Mountains of Victoria Land in Antarctica. It flows northwest between the Lyttelton Range and Dunedin Range, turning east on rounding the latter range to enter the sea south of Cape Scott. The coastal extremity of the glacier was charted in 1911–12 by the Northern Party, led by Victor Campbell, of the British Antarctic Expedition, 1910–13. The geographical feature lies situated on the Pennell Coast, a portion of Antarctica lying between Cape Williams and Cape Adare.

The glacier is named after Jim Dennistoun, a New Zealand alpinist who was in charge of the mules on board the Terra Nova on her way to Antarctica. The entire extent of the glacier was mapped by the U.S. Geological Survey from surveys and U.S. Navy aerial photography, 1960–63. The name Fowlie Glacier, which in fact refers to a tributary glacier, has sometimes been inadvertently misapplied to this feature.

See also
 List of glaciers in the Antarctic
 Glaciology

References

Admiralty Mountains
Glaciers of Pennell Coast